Jon "Bowzer" Bauman (born September 14, 1947) is an American singer, best known as a member of the band Sha Na Na, and game show host. Bauman's Sha Na Na character, "Bowzer", was a greaser in a muscle shirt.

Biography and career

Bauman was born in Brooklyn, New York City, New York. He started attending The Juilliard School at age 12 with an expertise in piano playing, and is a 1964 graduate of Martin Van Buren High School in Queens Village, Queens. He then attended Columbia University, graduating in 1968. Bauman was a member of the band Sha Na Na between 1970 and 1983. He was featured in the television comedy/variety show Sha Na Na from 1977 to 1981. In his "Bowzer" persona, Bauman became instantly recognizable for his "greaser" clothes and hair, his muscular pose with his arm, and his catchphrase "Grease for Peace!". In the late 1970s, Bauman appeared as "Bowzer" (loosely in-character) on many game shows, including Match Game and Password Plus. After his heyday with Sha Na Na, Bauman was a VJ on the music channel VH-1 during its first two years. He has appeared on many television series, such as Miami Vice, and has also done voiceovers for animated series, such as Animaniacs, and animated feature films, including My Little Pony: The Movie and The Jetsons Meet the Flintstones. He also hosted the Hollywood Squares half of the Match Game-Hollywood Squares Hour. Bauman also hosted The Pop 'N Rocker Game, a weekly syndicated rock 'n' roll game show, which launched a few weeks before the Match Game-Hollywood Squares Hour premiered.

Jon Bauman Productions produced The Golden Age of Rock 'n' Roll, a 10-hour series for the A&E Network.

Bauman tours extensively with his Bowzer and the Stingrays group at fairs, amusement parks, cruise ships, malt shoppes and conventions all over the world. They headline "Bowzer's Ultimate Milkshake Party".

Personal life
Bauman lives in Los Angeles with his wife, Mary, and their two children, Nora and Eli, who both graduated from Columbia University. His nephew is Eric C. Bauman, former chairman of the California Democratic Party.

Bauman has spoken on behalf of musicians who are upset about contemporary groups who use classic groups' names even though none of the members performed on any of the albums. Supporters include Charlie Thomas of the Drifters and before their deaths, Mary Wilson of the Supremes;  Carl Gardner of the Coasters and original Drifter Bill Pinkney were also supporters. Bauman has also helped pass legislation that would compel any group using the name of a classic group to have at least one of the original members. The measure is known as the Truth in Music Act.

Bauman regularly campaigns for Democrats in special elections, including Mark Critz in 2010, Kathy Hochul in 2011, David Weprin in 2011 and Elizabeth Colbert Busch in 2013. He endorsed Barack Obama for President in 2008. He has also worked as a spokesman for the National Committee to Preserve Social Security and Medicare and recorded wake-up calls for employees of the Democratic Congressional Campaign Committee. He is also a co-founder of the group Senior Votes Count, which is a political action committee designed to elect leaders to protect and advance the rights of elderly Americans. In the 2016 presidential election, Bauman endorsed Hillary Clinton, campaigning for her across the country, including in Iowa and Ohio.

He is currently president of Social Security Works PAC, a national organization working to elect candidates who support protecting and expanding Social Security benefits.

In popular media
Bauman is referenced in "The Chanukah Song" by Adam Sandler, "Parents Just Don't Understand" by DJ Jazzy Jeff & the Fresh Prince, the NewsRadio episode "Chock", and in "D'oh-in' in the Wind—the sixth episode of the tenth season of The Simpsons.

References

External links
 
 
 
 

1947 births
Living people
California Democrats
American game show hosts
Columbia College (New York) alumni
Martin Van Buren High School alumni
Musicians from Brooklyn
Sha Na Na members
Jewish American musicians
VH1 people
21st-century American Jews